The Alum Shale Formation (also known as alum schist and alum slate) is a formation of black shale of Middle Cambrian to Tremadocian (Lower Ordovician) in age found predominantly in southern Scandinavia.  It is shale or clay slate containing pyrite. Decomposition of pyrite by weathering forms sulfuric acid, which acts on potash and alumina constituents to form alum, which often occurs as efflorescences on the rock outcrop.

As the formation contains kerogen originated from algae, it is also classified as marinite-type oil shale. At the same time it is rich in aromatic hydrocarbon attributed to post-depositional irradiation damage to saturated hydrocarbons, induced by uranium concentration in the shale.  Alum shale also contains enhanced levels of radium as a result of uranium decay. Between 1950 and 1989, Sweden used alum shale for the uranium production.

See also

Orsten, a lagerstätte in the Alum Shale Formation

References

Geologic formations of Denmark
Geologic formations of Norway
Geologic formations of Sweden
Cambrian System of Europe
Ordovician System of Europe
Paleozoic Denmark
Cambrian Norway
Ordovician Norway
Paleozoic Sweden
Ordovician Sweden
Shale formations
Oil shale geology
Lagerstätten
Cambrian southern paleotemperate deposits
Ordovician southern paleotemperate deposits